The Combretaceae, often called the white mangrove family, are a family of flowering plants in the order Myrtales. The family includes about 530 species of trees, shrubs, and lianas in ca 10 genera. The family includes the leadwood tree, Combretum imberbe. Three genera, Conocarpus, Laguncularia, and Lumnitzera, grow in mangrove habitats (mangals). The Combretaceae are widespread in the subtropics and tropics. Some members of this family produce useful construction timber, such as idigbo from Terminalia ivorensis. The commonly cultivated Quisqualis indica (as well as the entire former genus Quisqualis) is now placed in the genus Combretum. Many plants in the former Quisqualis genus contain the excitotoxin quisqualic acid, a potent AMPA agonist.

White mangroves
The family name comes from the type genus Combretum; it also includes the white mangrove, Laguncularia racemosa, found along seacoasts in tropical America and West Africa.

Genera
Plants of the World Online currently includes:

Combretum Loefl.
Conocarpus L.
Dansiea Byrnes
Getonia Roxb. (synonym Calycopteris)
Guiera Adans. ex Juss.
Laguncularia C.F.Gaertn. (monotypic)
Lumnitzera Willd.
Macropteranthes F.Muell.
Strephonema Hook.f.
Terminalia L. (synonyms: Anogeissus, Buchenavia, Bucida, Pteleopsis, Terminaliopsis)

synonyms of Combretum
Meiostemon Exell & Stace
Quisqualis L.
Thiloa Eichler

References

External links

 
Myrtales families
Taxa named by Robert Brown (botanist, born 1773)